Loh Kean Hean (born 12 March 1995) is a Singaporean badminton player.

Career 
Born in Penang, Loh permanently moved to Singapore in 2009 after receiving a scholarship from the Singapore Badminton Association (SBA). His younger brother followed him soon after.

Loh studied at Montfort Secondary School in Hougang while training with the Singapore national badminton team.

In 2014, he was the mixed doubles runner-up at the Singapore International Series tournament partnered with Dellis Yuliana, and in 2015, he won the men's doubles title with Terry Hee.

Personal life 
Loh has 2 elder brothers and a younger brother, Loh Kean Yew, who is also a member of the Singapore national badminton team and is the 2021 BWF World Champion in the Men's singles Discipline.

Achievements

Southeast Asian Games 
Men's doubles

BWF International Challenge/Series (3 titles, 2 runners-up) 
Men's doubles

Mixed doubles

  BWF International Challenge tournament
  BWF International Series tournament
  BWF Future Series tournament

References

External links 
 

Living people
1995 births
People from Penang
Malaysian emigrants to Singapore
Singaporean people of Chinese descent
Singaporean people of Hokkien descent
Singaporean male badminton players
Singapore Sports School alumni
Badminton players at the 2022 Commonwealth Games
Commonwealth Games bronze medallists for Singapore
Commonwealth Games medallists in badminton
Competitors at the 2015 Southeast Asian Games
Competitors at the 2017 Southeast Asian Games
Competitors at the 2019 Southeast Asian Games
Competitors at the 2021 Southeast Asian Games
Southeast Asian Games bronze medalists for Singapore
Southeast Asian Games medalists in badminton
Medallists at the 2022 Commonwealth Games